Peter Thomsen (born 4 April 1961 in Flensburg, West Germany) is a German eventing rider. He won the gold medal in team eventing at the 2008 Summer Olympics with his horse The Ghost of Hamish, and again at the 2012 Summer Olympics with his horse Barny.

References

External links
 Official Website

German event riders
Olympic gold medalists for Germany
Equestrians at the 1996 Summer Olympics
Equestrians at the 2008 Summer Olympics
Equestrians at the 2012 Summer Olympics
Olympic equestrians of Germany
German male equestrians
Living people
1961 births
Olympic medalists in equestrian
Medalists at the 2012 Summer Olympics
Medalists at the 2008 Summer Olympics
People from Flensburg
Sportspeople from Schleswig-Holstein